= British Loyalist =

British loyalist may refer to:

- Loyalist (American Revolution)
- Ulster loyalism
